Daniel Sperrle (born 7 October 1982 in Sundbyberg, Sweden) is a Swedish professional ice hockey goaltender, who played for Dinamo Riga.

Career 
Sperrle played 5 games in the Kontinental Hockey League for the Dinamo Riga. He was last playing with EfB Ishockey in Denmark.

He currently has the modern time world record for clean sheets with 390 minutes and 12 seconds. Sperrle took the record from Brian Boucher in 2009. Bouchers record was 332 minutes.

External links

1982 births
Living people
Dinamo Riga players
Expatriate ice hockey players in Russia
Swedish ice hockey goaltenders
Swedish expatriate sportspeople in Latvia
Swedish expatriate sportspeople in Russia
Linköping HC players
AIK IF players
Mora IK players
Brynäs IF players
Leksands IF players
Molot-Prikamye Perm players